Aleksandar Trifunović (born 13 May 1954) is a Serbian former football manager and player.

Club career
After starting out at Sloga Kraljevo and completing his compulsory military service, Trifunović joined Partizan in the second part of the 1975–76 season, as the club won the championship. He would spend seven and a half years with the Crno-beli, amassing over 200 league appearances and scoring 20 goals. Between 1983 and 1987, Trifunović played for Ascoli in Italy. He retired after playing with Obilić.

International career
At international level, Trifunović represented Yugoslavia between 1977 and 1983, collecting 11 caps and scoring two goals.

Post-playing career
After hanging up his boots, Trifunović served as manager of several clubs, including Železnik in the 1990s.

Honours
Partizan
 Yugoslav First League: 1975–76, 1977–78, 1982–83
 Mitropa Cup: 1977–78
Ascoli
 Serie B: 1985–86

References

External links
 
 
 

1954 births
Living people
People from Leposavić
Kosovo Serbs
Yugoslav footballers
Serbian footballers
Association football midfielders
Yugoslavia international footballers
FK Sloga Kraljevo players
FK Partizan players
Ascoli Calcio 1898 F.C. players
FK Obilić players
Yugoslav Second League players
Yugoslav First League players
Serie A players
Serie B players
Yugoslav expatriate footballers
Expatriate footballers in Italy
Yugoslav expatriate sportspeople in Italy
Serbia and Montenegro football managers
Serbian football managers
FK Železnik managers